This is a list of universities and colleges in Tigray, Ethiopia. It includes both public, governmental, and private institutions.

References

Universities and colleges in Ethiopia